Celestino Gorostiza Alcalá (born January 31, 1904 in Villahermosa – January 11, 1967 in Mexico City) was a Mexican theater and cine playwright, director and dramatist.

Biography 
Gorostiza, son of Celestino Gorostiza and Elvira Alcalá de Gorostiza, was the older brother of José Gorostiza. He was co-founder of the Ulises theater (1927-1928) and of the Orientación theater (1932), both in Mexico City Gorostiza was married to Araceli Otero Mena, older sister of Clementina Otero. Araceli gave birth to their daughter Paloma Gorostiza Otero.

He was a numbered member of the Academia Mexicana de la Lengua and a member of the Academia Mexicana de Artes y Ciencias Cinematográficas, as well as director of the department of theater at the Instituto Nacional de Bellas Artes. Due to his 100th birthday in 2004, a 7 Mex$ memorial stamp was launched.

Filmography

Director 
 Ave de paso (1948) 
 Sinfonía de una vida (1946; English title Symphony of Life)
 Nana (1944; together with Roberto Gavaldón)

Writer 
 Paraíso robado (dialogue, adaptation; 1951; English title: Stolen Paradise)
 My General's Women (1951) (based on the story "La soldadera", written together with Joselito Rodríguez)
 Ave de paso (1948; together with Max Aub and María Gesa)
 Sinfonía de una vida (1946; together with Max Aub, María Gesa and Pablo González)
 Nana (dialogue; 1944)
 La guerra de los pasteles (story; 1944; English title: War of the Pastries)
 Refugiados en Madrid (dialogue; 1938; English title: Refugees in Madrid)

Production supervisor 
 Vámonos con Pancho Villa (1936; American title: Let's Go with Pancho Villa; English title: Let's Join Pancho Villa)

Theater works 
 La Malinche, 1958 (historical drama)
 La leña está verde, 1958
 Columna social, 1953
 El color de nuestra piel, 1952 (three-act play)
 La mujer ideal, 1943
 La reina de la nieve, 1942
 Escombros del sueño, 1938
 El nuevo paraíso, 1930
 Ser o no ser, 1934
 La escuela del amor, 1933

Awards 
 Premio Ruiz de Alarcón, for El color de nuestra piel, 1952

Literature 
 Celestino Gorostiza - una vida para el teatro (Spanish), Instituto Nacional de Bellas Artes, Mexico City, 2004 
 Celestino Gorostiza (1904–1967)- Teatro completo (Spanish), 2004

References

External links 
 Celestino Gorostiza in the Ibero-American Institute's catalogue
 

Mexican dramatists and playwrights
Mexican film directors
Mexican theatre directors
People from Villahermosa
1904 births
1967 deaths
20th-century Mexican dramatists and playwrights